Qi Kang (Chinese: 齐康),  is a Chinese artist and architect. He is a supervisor in Southeast University, Academician of  Chinese Academy of Sciences, Foreign Academician of French Academy of Architecture ( Académie d'architecture de France), and Director of Research Institute of Architecture of Southeast University.

Early life 
Qi's family is originally from Tiantai County, Zhejiang Province, China. Qi's family is descendant Qi Zhaonan(齊召南), a notable Chinese geologist and writer.
In 1931, Qi was born in Nanjing, China. Qi's mother is Chen Youhe and his father is Qi Zhaochang.
Qi's father was the chief engineer of the Nanjing University (formally Jingling University) from 1920 to 1950. His mother taught Mathematics at Heiwen High School for Girls (which later became Jinling College).

In 1949, Qi graduated from Jinling High School.

Education 
In 1952, Qi graduated with a degree in architecture from Southeast University (formally Nanjing Institute of Technology). Qi studied under professors Yang Tingbao, Liu Dunzhen (刘敦桢) and Tong Jun (童寯).

Career 
Qi started his career teaching at Southeast University.

In 1954, Qi became an intern planner at Beijing Capital City Planning Committee, where he worked until 1957.

After returning to Southeast University, Qi was appointed as the educational research group director, head of the Department of Architecture and vice-president of University. Qi  established The Research Institute of Architecture in South East University in 1980- the first institution allowing architects to teach graduate students and practice architectural design in China.

Projects
Qi works to integrate contemporary and Western technology in redefining Chinese Architecture. His work, which stems from Classical principles, is imbued with contemporary innovations. Over the past 50 years, many Chinese architects tend to either adhere to classical forms, or embrace the western approach. Qi Kang has combined the two.
In the past 40 years, he has designed over 200 projects, many of which are meaningful to China. Among those that have won acclaim beyond China are:
Fujian Wuyi Mountain Villa, 1984
Nanjing Massacre Memorial Hall, 1983–1985 (Phase 1), 1995 (Phase 2)
Yuhuatai Memorial Park of Revolutionary Martyrs, 1988
Henan Museum, 1999
Harbin Jingshang History Museum, 1998
Nanjing Gulou Post Mansion, c. 1998
September 18 Historical Museum (九·一八历史博物馆), 1999
Nanjing Museum of Paleontology (南京古生物博物馆), 2004
China Shoes Museum, 2005

Teaching and Research
Qi Kang is a teacher and researcher. He has participated in or chaired many national, provincial and regional planning associations and committees critical in the reconstruction of China.
His research paper “Urbanization Process of Relatively Developed Regions and Small Cities Procedural Economy Policies” received 2nd place of “Progressive Science and Technique Award” by the Ministry of Construction. His Recheach “The Synthesis Planning Method for Villages and Towns”, “The City Planning and Architectural Environmental Design Theory and the Method” and “The Citys and Towns Environmental Design”  wins the Ministry of Education Technological Award first prize, the second prize, the third prize separately. 
Qi Kang is an avid sketcher who draws whenever not otherwise engaged. He has completed volumes of drawings—of architecture and landscape—which widely used by architectural students and others.

Publications
Selected books by Qi Kang:
Urban Planning
城市建筑, publisher: 东南大学出版社, 
城市环境规划设计与方法, Publisher:中国建筑工业出版社, 
走向新社区:城市居住社区整体营造理论与方法, publisher:东南大学出版社, 
Architecture
日月同辉：南京雨花台烈士陵园纪念馆、碑轴线群体的创作设计(in Chinese, English and Japanese), Publisher: 辽宁科学技术出版社, 
建筑创作的纪程—齐康作品集,Publisher:中国建筑工业出版社, 
齐康建筑设计作品系列：4, Publisher: 辽宁科学技术出版社, 
齐康建筑设计作品系列：3, Publisher: 辽宁科学技术出版社, 
齐康建筑设计作品系列：7, Publisher: 辽宁科学技术出版社, 
建筑创意(齐康及其合作者作品选),Publisher: 东南大学出版社, 
 "九•一八"历史博物馆(in Chinese, English and Japanese), Publisher: 辽宁科学技术出版社, 
建筑思迹, publisher: 黑龙江科学技术出版社, 
纪念的凝思 (Condensation in Memorial Thought), publisher:中国建筑工业出版社, 
侵华日军南京大屠杀遇难同胞纪念馆(in Chinese, English and Japanese), publisher:辽宁科学技术出版社, 
Drawings and Paintings
风景入画-建筑师钢笔风景画, publisher: 东南大学出版社, 2007
画的记忆-建筑师徒手画, publisher: 东南大学出版社, 2007
水的彩虹:齐康水彩画选(建筑学基础训练参考丛书), publisher: 东南大学出版社,  / ,2009

References

Building a revolution: Chinese architecture since 1980, by Charlie Q. L. Xue, page108. 
Re-envisioning the Chinese revolution: the politics and the poetics of collective memories in reform China, By Ching Kwan Lee, Guobin Yang, page 259. ,, 
Sir Banister Fletcher’s a History of Architecture, page 1567. 
Architectural Encounters with Essence and Form in Modern China, By Peter G. Rowe, Seng Kuan, page 223. , 
International Architecture Yearbook, - Architecture – 2000, by Images Publishing, 256 pages. , 
Encyclopedia of 20th Century Architecture, by Stephen Sennott, Page 251,

Exhibitions
His architectural design works has been exhibited in China, France, Switzerland, and Canada.

External links 
www.seu.edu.cn
www.chinavitae.com/biography/Qi_Kang
webplus.seu.edu.cn
www.chinaacsc.com/
Interview of designing Nanjing Massacre Memorial Hall 
Detailed Biography 

1931 births
Artists from Nanjing
Chinese architects
Living people
Members of the Académie d'architecture
Members of the Chinese Academy of Sciences
Southeast University alumni
Academic staff of Southeast University